Events in the year 2004 in Portugal.

Incumbents
President: Jorge Sampaio
Prime Minister: Pedro Santana Lopes

Arts and entertainment

Film
21 October – In the Darkness of the Night released.

Sports
Football (soccer) competitions: Primeira Liga, Liga de Honra

Deaths

2 February – Kaúlza de Arriaga, military officer (born 1915)
12 May – Álvaro Cardoso, football player (born 1914)
2 July – Sophia de Mello Breyner Andresen, poet (born 1919).
10 July – Maria de Lourdes Pintasilgo, chemical engineer and politician (born 1930)

See also
List of Portuguese films of 2004

References

 
2000s in Portugal
Years of the 21st century in Portugal
Portugal
Portugal